Las Fierbinți is a Romanian sitcom that premiered on Pro TV on March 1, 2012, created by Mimi Brănescu, and directed by Dragoș Buliga and Constantin Popescu.

Set in a rural place Fierbinți, the series follows the social and romantic lives of the inhabitants from this village. The most important people are the mayor and the bartender.

Cast and characters

Main characters 

 Vasile (Gheorghe Ifrim) is the mayor of Fierbinți.
 Bobiță (Mihai Bobonete) is the owner of the rural bar.
 Giani (Constantin Diță) is the town's stupid, born in Fierbinți, but moved for a while to Italy for work. He returned to his native places. Giani and Bobiță are best friends.
 Dorel (Mihai Rait Dragomir) is Bobiță's brother.
 Robi (Leonid Doni) is the chief policeman of the village.
 Geanina (Anca Dumitra) is the daughter of the previous mayor.
 Dalida (Ecaterina Țugulea) is the mayor's personal assistant.
 Celentano (Adrian Văncică) is the biggest boozer from Fierbinți.
 Firicel (Toma Cuzin) is Celentano's best friend.
 Ardiles (Mihai Mărgineanu) town's thief, a friend of Celentano's and Firicel's.
 Aspirina (Mirela Oprișor) is the village prostitute.
 Ardiles' father (Constantin Drăgănescu (Season 1), Dumitru Dumitru (Season 2)
 Ardiles' mother (Camelia Zorlescu) 
 Țața Lica (Cici Caraman)

Past characters

Season One 

 Mitică (Radu Gabriel) - former mayor of the village. Lost the elections against Vasile.
 Plopu (Gheorghe Dănilă) 
 Leana lu' Plopu (Maria Junghiețu)

Reception 

The pilot episode of the series brought the best audiences for a Romanian TV show in the last 10 years. It had an 11.6 rating and 25.4 share. The first episode of season 11 reportedly brought an audience of 2.1 million viewers.

Series overview

Episodes

Season 1

Season 2

Season 3

Season 4

Season 5

Season 6

Season 7

Season 8

Season 9

Season 10

Season 11

Season 12

Sezonul 13

Season 14

Season 15

Season 16

Season 17

References

External links 
 Show website at protv.ro
 Show website at cinemagia.ro

2012 Romanian television series debuts
Romanian comedy television series
Pro TV original programming